The 1927 Korvpalli Meistriliiga was the 2nd season of the Estonian basketball league.

The season started on 12 February 1927 and concluded on 27 March 1927 with Tallinna Kalev winning their 1st Estonian League title.

References

External links
 Official website 

Korvpalli Meistriliiga seasons
1927 in basketball
1927 in Estonian sport